Cyclotorna ementita is a moth of the family Cyclotornidae. It is found in Australia.

References 

Moths of Australia
Cyclotornidae
Moths described in 1921
Taxa named by Edward Meyrick